Simone McAullay (born 14 April 1976) is an Australian actress.

Study and early career 
Born in Perth, Western Australia, McAullay moved to the East Coast as a late teenager, living in Byron Bay, and in the late 1990s, she auditioned to study at The Actors Centre in Sydney. After several years of study there, she graduated in 2000.

In 2001, she was selected for the role of Angie McIntyre in the series Crash Palace. Also in 2001, she played the role of Mrs Harrison in the feature film, Invincible.

Blue Heelers 
In a breakthrough role, from 2003 until 2006, she played the role of Senior Constable Susie Raynor on popular Australian drama series Blue Heelers.

Home and Away, The Strip 
In 2007, McAullay appeared in a recurring role as Vivian Anderson on Home and Away for 15 episodes. She returned to Home and Away in April 2008 for five episodes.

In 2008, she portrayed forensic policewoman Jessica Mackay in the TV drama series, The Strip, a police crime drama set on the Gold Coast in Queensland, for the Nine Network.

UK career and Broadchurch 
From 2013 to 2015, she auditioned from Australia for a role of hotelier Becca Fisher in the high-profile ITV drama series Broadchurch. After being selected for the role, she relocated to the UK to begin work on the series, which became a critically acclaimed drama.

Whilst in the UK she had guest roles as Janine in The Smoke on Sky1, in the finale of The IT Crowd, and as Ruth Culver on Holby City. She also enjoyed a guest role on live recorded sitcom Count Arthur Strong, and played Lyra in indie feature film Access All Areas.

In 2016, she played the role of Jess Philips in the BBC Birmingham series, The Coroner.

Return to Australia 
After arriving back home in Australia in 2018, Simone joined the cast of The Commons as Francesca Boulay for streaming service Stan in 2019.

In 2020, Simone played Alisa Black in three episodes of Cowboy Bebop, for Netflix US, filmed in New Zealand.

In 2022 she joined the cast of La Brea season 2 as Kiera, for NBC.

Filmography

References

External links

1976 births
Living people
Actresses from Perth, Western Australia
Australian television actresses
21st-century Australian actresses